Rockney Ridge is a rock ridge on the northeast side of Mount Goorhigian in the Demas Range, Marie Byrd Land. Mapped by United States Geological Survey (USGS) from surveys and U.S. Navy air photos, 1959–65. Named by Advisory Committee on Antarctic Names (US-ACAN) for Vaughn D. Rockney, meteorologist at Byrd Station, 1968–69.
 

Ridges of Marie Byrd Land